Marc Orfaly is a Boston based chef, restaurateur and the Culinary Director of the Navy Yard Hospitality Group.

Personal life
Orfaly grew up in Brookline, Massachusetts and is a graduate of Johnson & Wales University.

Career
It was when Orfaly began working for Todd English that people in Boston  began to know who he was. He has worked for Joachim Splichal in Los Angeles, Mark Peel and Nancy Silverton at Campanile and in New York with Rocco DiSpirito.

In 2001, he opened Pigalle with co-co-owner Kerri Foley, who is also his wife. Food & Wine named it one of the Top 10 New Restaurants and Bon Appétit named it Best New Restaurant in Boston.  He was also executive chef at The Beehive, also in Boston, and opened Marco in the North End.

Honors and awards
Orfaly was nominated for a James Beard Foundation Award multiple times (Nominee, Best Chefs in America 2005, 2006, 2007, 2008, 2009 and 2010) and Food & Wine named him one of the best new chefs of 2004.

References

Living people
Chefs from Massachusetts
American restaurateurs
People from Brookline, Massachusetts
Johnson & Wales University alumni
American male chefs
Year of birth missing (living people)